Memsaab  may refer to:

 Memsaab or Memsahib, a variation of Sahib, an Arabic term, which is also a loanword in several languages.  Memsaab is a title for a woman in a position of authority and/or the wife of a Sahib.  
 Memsaab (film), a 1971  Bollywood  drama film